Ulstrup is a surname. Notable people with the surname include:

Arnt Severin Ulstrup (1862–1922), Norwegian physician and politician 
Åshild Ulstrup (born 1934), Norwegian journalist and radio personality

Norwegian-language surnames